Jason Woliner  is an American director, writer and a former child actor. He was the non-performing member of the comedy group Human Giant and directed the bulk of their output. After that, he directed, co-wrote, and acted as showrunner on the cult Adult Swim series Eagleheart starring Chris Elliott. Woliner has directed episodes of Fox's The Last Man on Earth, NBC's Parks and Recreation, and Comedy Central's Nathan for You and Jon Benjamin Has a Van, among others. In 2020, he directed film Borat Subsequent Moviefilm

Early life and acting career
Woliner attended Pelham Memorial High School and for higher study at Sarah Lawrence College from 1998 to 2000 before dropping out to pursue a directing career.

Directing career
After leaving school, Woliner began making films and videos, both on his own and with comedians in New York, which led to the formation of Human Giant. The first three Human Giant videos ("Shutterbugs", "Illusionators", and the "Shittiest Mixtape Boombox Blast") caught the eyes of executives at MTV, who offered the group a pilot. The show ran for two seasons.

He has collaborated with writer-performer Brett Gelman on a series of horror/comedy specials for Adult Swim. The first of these, titled Dinner with Friends with Brett Gelman and Friends, aired in April 2014, and the second special, titled Dinner with Family with Brett Gelman and Brett Gelman's Family, aired in February 2015. The third special, Brett Gelman's Dinner in America, aired in July 2016. Woliner and Gelman wrote the specials together; Gelman stars and Woliner directed.

In 2020, he directed the comedy film Borat Subsequent Moviefilm.

In 2023, Woliner directed Paul T. Goldman, a hybrid documentary-comedy series for Peacock.

Filmography

Film 

Special thanks
 Origin Story (2018)
 Mister America (2019)

Television

References

External links
 
 A.V. Club interview with Human Giant
 Human Giant site

Year of birth missing (living people)
Living people
21st-century American comedians
21st-century American male writers
21st-century American screenwriters
American male child actors
American male comedians
American male film actors
American television writers
American male television writers
American television directors
Comedians from New York City
Film directors from New York City
Male actors from New York City
Screenwriters from New York (state)
Writers from the Bronx